Malesherbia tenuifolia is an vulnerable subshrub native to Candarave, Peru and Tarapacá, Chile. It is found at altitudes of 1550-2400m. It can grow up to 150cm tall, is ashy-green, and has dark red flowers.

References 

tenuifolia
Endemic flora of Chile
Plants described in 1832
Taxa named by David Don